Katleen De Caluwé (born 22 December 1976 in Reet, Antwerp Province) is a Belgian sprinter, who specializes in the 100 metres. Her personal best time is 11.49 seconds, achieved in May 2002 in Oordegem.

De Caluwé finished sixth in 4 x 100 metres relay at the 2004 Summer Olympics, with teammates Lien Huyghebaert, Élodie Ouédraogo and Kim Gevaert. This team set a national record of 43.08 seconds in the heat.

References

1976 births
Living people
Belgian female sprinters
Athletes (track and field) at the 2004 Summer Olympics
Olympic athletes of Belgium
Olympic female sprinters